Jaswinder Bolina is an American poet.  He is the author of the chapbook The Tallest Building in America (2014) and a book of essays Of Color (2020). His full-length poetry collections are Carrier Wave (2007); Phantom Camera (2013), which won the Green Rose Prize in Poetry from New Issues Poetry & Prose; and The 44th of July.

Bolina's poems have been published on the Poetry Society of America's website.

Bolina was born in Chicago.  He is an associate professor at the University of Miami, where he currently teaches in the MFA program.

References 

Living people
American poets
1978 births